The office tower The Rock at the Gustav Mahlersquare is part of the Mahler 4 office area in Amsterdam.

The building distinguishes itself by the crooked glass, aluminum, stone and concrete elements. The building seems to be much heavier at the upper parts compared to the lower area. The design is very rough and feels like a rock. It is one of the tallest buildings at the Zuidas in Amsterdam.

Interior 
The interior is created from the stone, wood and brass. In the offices the design is relatively simple. Although most of the building is characterized by straight edges and sleek shapes, the entrance has more rounded shapes and smooth transitions. The staircase in the main entrance won a prize for 'Staircase of the year' from EeStairs in the year 2012.

References

External links 
 

Skyscrapers in Amsterdam
Skyscraper office buildings in the Netherlands
Office buildings completed in 2009
Amsterdam-Zuid